Relaxin/insulin-like family peptide receptor 1, also known as RXFP1, is a human G protein coupled receptor that is one of the relaxin receptors. It is a rhodopsin-like GPCR which is unusual in this class as it contains a large extracellular binding and signalling domain. Some reports suggest that RXFP1 forms homodimers, however the most recent evidence indicates that relaxin binds a non-homodimer of RXFP1.

See also 
 Relaxin family peptide hormones
 Insulin/IGF/Relaxin family
 Relaxin
 Relaxin-3

References

Further reading

External links 
 

G protein-coupled receptors